The former French Catholic diocese of Vabres existed from 1317 to the French Revolution. After the Concordat of 1801 its territory was divided between the diocese of Cahors and the diocese of Montpellier.

The Benedictine Abbey of Vabres, founded in 862 by Raymond I, Count of Toulouse, was raised to episcopal rank in 1317, and its diocesan territory was taken from the southeastern portion of the Diocese of Rodez. Its see was Vabres Cathedral.

Bishops
Pierre d'Olargues (1317–1329)
Raymond d'Olargues (1329–1347)
Pierre d'Aigrefeuille (1347–1349)
Guy de Ventadour (1349–1352)
Bertrand de Pébrac (1352–1360)
Guillaume Bragosse (1361)
Etienne de Vassignac (1362–1409)
Mathieu Proti (1409–1413)
Guillaume de Bastidos (1413–1421)
Jean de Pierre (1421–1453)
Bernard de Blanc (1453–1485)
Antoine Pierre de Narbonne (1486–1499)
Louis de Narbonne (1499–1518)
Réginal de Marigny (1519–1536)
Georges d'Armagnac (1536–1547) (administrator, also Bishop of Rodez)
Jacques de Corneillan (1547–1561) (administrator, also Bishop of Rodez)
François I. de la Valette-Cormusson (1561–1585)
Thomas de Lauro (1585–1593)
François II. de la Valette-Cormusson (1600–1622)
François III. de la Valette-Cormusson (1622–1644)
Isaac Hubert (1645–1668)
Louis de la Vermhe Montemard de Tressan (1669–1671)
Louis de Baradat (1673–1710)
Charles-Alexandre le Filleul de la Chapelle (1710–1764)
Jean de la Croix de Castrie (1764–1796)

See also 
 Catholic Church in France
 List of Catholic dioceses in France

Notes

Bibliography

Sources
 pp. 548–549. (Use with caution; obsolete)
  p. 301. (in Latin)
 p. 175.

 p. 219.

Studies

Acknowledgment

Vabres
1317 establishments in Europe
1310s establishments in France
1801 disestablishments in France
Religious organizations established in the 1310s
Vabres